The Diocese of Tempio-Ampurias is a Roman Catholic ecclesiastical territory in Sardinia, Italy. Until 1986 it was known as Diocese of Ampurias e Tempio. It is a suffragan of the Archdiocese of Sassari

It had borne that name since 1506, when it was combined with the diocese of Tempio, previously being simply the diocese of Ampurias.

History
Ampurias was erected in 1113; the diocese of Cività, now Tempio, in 304 by St. Simplicius. Cività was united to Ampurias by Pope Julius II in 1506.

Later the see was transferred to Terranuova. Pope Gregory XVI suppressed the cathedral there by the Bull Quamvis aqua, 26 August 1839, and raised the Collegiate Church of St. Peter, in Tempio, to a cathedral, uniting Tempio and Ampurias, so that one bishop should govern both.

The see was vacant from 1854 to 1871. Antonio Maria Contini was appointed bishop of Ogliastra, 26 September 1882, and transferred to this diocese, 16 January 1893.

Bishops
Antonio de Alcala (1457–1472 Appointed, Bishop of Ottana)
Francesco Manno (bishop) (1493–1511 Died)
Luis González (bishop), O.F.M.  (1513–1538 Died)
Giorgio Artea (1538–1545 Died)
Ludovico de Cotes, O.S.A.  (1545–1557 Died)
Francisco Tomás (1558–1572 Died)
Pedro Narro (1572–1574 Appointed, Archbishop of Oristano)
Gaspar Vicente Novella (1575–1578 Appointed, Archbishop of Cagliari)
Miguel Rubio, O. Cist.  (1579–1586 Died)
Giovanni Sanna (1586–1607 Died)
Felipe Marimón (1608–1613 Died)
Giacomo Passamar (1613–1622 Appointed, Archbishop of Sassari)
Giovanni de La Bronda (1622–1633 Died)
Andrea Manca (1633–13 Jul 1644 Appointed, Archbishop of Sassari)
Gavino Manca Figo (1644–1652 Died)
Gaspare Litago (1652–1656 Confirmed, Archbishop of Sassari)
Lorenzo Sampero (1656–1669 Died)
Pedro de Alagón y de Cardona (1669–1672 Appointed, Archbishop of Oristano)
José Sanchís y Ferrandis, O. de M.  (1672–1673 Confirmed, Bishop of Segorbe)
Juan Bautista Sorribas, O. Carm.  (1673–1678 Died)
Giuseppe Acorrà (1679–1685 Appointed, Archbishop of Oristano)
Francesco Sampero (1685–1688 Died)
Michele Villa (1688–1700 Died)
Diego Serafino Posulo (Pozuli), O.P.  (1702–1718 Died)
Angelo Galzerin, O.F.M. Conv.  (1727– 1735 Died)
Giovanni Leonardo Sanna  (1736– 1737 Confirmed, Bishop of Bosa)
Vincenzo Giovanni Vico Torrellas  (1737–1741 Confirmed, Archbishop of Oristano)
Salvator Angelo Cadello  (1741–1764 Died)
Pietro Paolo Carta  (1764–1771 Died)
Francesco Ignazio Guiso  (1772–1778 Died)
Giovanni Antonio Arras Minutili  (1779– 1784 Died)
Michele Pes (1785–1804 Died)
Giuseppe Stanislao Paradiso  (1807–1819 Confirmed, Bishop of Ales e Terralba)
Stanislao Mossa  (1823–1825 Died)
Diego Capece  (1833–1855 Died)
Filippo Campus Chessa  (1871–1887 Died)
Paolo Pinna  (1887–1892 Died)
Antonio Maria Contini  (1893–1907 Resigned)
Giovanni Maria Sanna, O.F.M. Conv.  (1914–1922 Appointed, Bishop of Gravina e Irsina)
Albino Morera  (1922–1950 Retired)
Carlo Re, I.M.C. (1951–1961 Resigned)
Mario Ghiga  (1961–1963 Died)
Giovanni Melis Fois  (1963–1970 Appointed, Bishop of Nuoro)
Carlo Urru  (1971–1982 Appointed, Bishop of Città di Castello)
Pietro Meloni (1983–1992 Appointed, Bishop of Nuoro)
Paolo Mario Virgilio Atzei, O.F.M. Conv. (1993–2004 Appointed, Archbishop of Sassari)
Sebastiano Sanguinetti (2006–)

Notes

References
Battandier, Ann. pont. cath. (1906)
Gams, Series episc. Ecclesiœ cathol. (Ratisbon, 1873)
Martini, Storia eccles. della Sardinia (Cagliari, 1839), IV, 349

External links
Source
gcatholic.org

Tempio
Tempio